The 2018–19 Arab Club Champions Cup, officially named the 2018–19 Zayed Champions Cup to mark 100 years since the birth of the late Sheikh Zayed bin Sultan Al Nahyan, was the 28th season of the Arab Club Champions Cup, the Arab world's club football tournament organised by UAFA, and the first season since it was renamed from the Arab Club Championship to the Arab Club Champions Cup.

The final was played at the Hazza bin Zayed Stadium in Al Ain, United Arab Emirates, between Al-Hilal of Saudi Arabia and Étoile du Sahel of Tunisia. It was the fourth time Al-Hilal reached the final in their history, while it marked the first appearance of Étoile du Sahel in this stage. Étoile du Sahel defeated Al-Hilal 2–1 in the final and won the title for the first time in their history, becoming the third Tunisian team to win the competition in the last five editions.

Espérance de Tunis were the defending champions, having won the title in the previous edition. They were eliminated by Al-Ittihad Alexandria in the first round.

Prize money
The prize money was as follows:
 Winners: $6 million
 Runners-up: $2.5 million

Teams
A total of 40 teams participated in the tournament; 20 from Asia and 20 from Africa. 10 clubs started in the qualifying play-off where two of them advanced to the first round which consisted of 32 teams. From then on, the tournament was played in a knockout format with home and away legs, until the final which was a one-leg match played in the United Arab Emirates. Due to the new format of the competition only being announced after the 2016–17 season had already ended, UAFA decided that for this edition of the tournament, teams would be invited to participate rather than strictly qualifying through performance in the 2016–17 season's domestic competitions.

Notes

Schedule

The schedule of the competition was as follows:

Qualifying rounds

Preliminary round

Play-off round

Group A

Group B

Knockout phase

Bracket

First round

1–1 on aggregate. Zamalek won on away goals.

2–2 on aggregate. ES Sétif won on away goals.

2–2 on aggregate. Ismaily won 4–2 on penalties.

Raja Casablanca won 3–2 on aggregate.

1–1 on aggregate. Al-Wasl won on away goals.

3–3 on aggregate. Al-Naft won on away goals.

Al-Hilal won 2–0 on aggregate.

MC Alger won 2–1 on aggregate.

Étoile du Sahel won 6–2 on aggregate.

USM Alger won 4–0 on aggregate. They were awarded a 3–0 walkover win in the second leg after Al-Quwa Al-Jawiya's players withdrew from the match at 71 minutes while losing 2–0 in protest at offensive chants from the home fans.

Al-Nassr won 6–2 on aggregate.

3–3 on aggregate. Al-Ittihad Alexandria won on away goals.

2–2 on aggregate. Wydad Casablanca won 4–2 on penalties.

Al-Merrikh won 4–2 on aggregate.

Al-Ahly won 4–1 on aggregate.

Al-Ahli Jeddah won 5–0 on aggregate.

Second round

Al-Merrikh won 4–3 on aggregate.

MC Alger won 3–1 on aggregate.

3–3 on aggregate. Al-Wasl won on away goals.

Étoile du Sahel won 1–0 on aggregate.

Al-Hilal won 6–0 on aggregate.

0–0 on aggregate. Raja Casablanca won 4–2 on penalties.

1–1 on aggregate. Al-Ittihad Alexandria won 4–3 on penalties.

Al-Ahli Jeddah won 2–1 on aggregate.

Quarter-finals

Al-Hilal won 3–0 on aggregate. 

Al-Ahli Jeddah won 4–3 on aggregate. 

Étoile du Sahel won 2–1 on aggregate. 

Al-Merrikh won 3–0 on aggregate.

Semi-finals

1–1 on aggregate. Al-Hilal won 3–2 on penalties.

Étoile du Sahel won 1–0 on aggregate.

Final

Top scorers
Statistics exclude qualifying rounds.

Broadcasting

Notes & references

Notes

References

External links
UAFA Official website 

2018-19
2018 in Asian football
2018 in African football
2019 in Asian football
2018–19 in African football